Holy Sepulchre Cemetery is a cemetery in Hayward, California. It is a Catholic cemetery run by the Roman Catholic Diocese of Oakland, which also operates the Holy Angels Funeral and Cremation Center at the same location. It was the first Catholic Church-owned funeral home in the U.S.

The cemetery planted 3 acres of vineyards to provide grapes for sacramental wine used by the Oakland Diocese. The wine is bottled at Rockwall Winery in Alameda, which also sources grapes from Holy Cross Cemetery in Antioch, and St. Joseph's Cemetery in San Pablo. The cemetery vineyards are believed to be the only such vineyards in the United States.

Notable burials

 Chauncey Bailey, murdered Oakland-based journalist
 Del Courtney, big band leader and local TV personality
 Eddie Lake, Major League Baseball shortstop
 Tony Lema, golfer, winner of the 1964 British Open
 Fran Ryan, character actress
 Jackie Tobin (1921–1982), Major League Baseball infielder
 John H. Tolan, U.S. Representative from California
 There is one British Commonwealth war grave in this cemetery, of Captain John Joseph Kerwin, Royal Air Force Ferry Command (died 1941).

References

External links
 
 
  

Cemeteries in Hayward, California
Roman Catholic cemeteries in California